William Graziadei (born July 28, 1969) is an American musician best known as the lead vocalist, rhythm guitarist, and founding member of Biohazard. He is also the rhythm guitarist and backing vocalist of the band Powerflo and frontman for BillyBio, his latest solo project. In addition, he is the former rhythm guitarist for Suicide City. Graziadei also performed as part of the Roadrunner United project in 2005 as well as Blood for Blood in 2010.

Additionally, through his music, Graziadei frequently speaks about the realities of inner city life in New York City, while promoting tolerance, speaking out against racism and opposing drug abuse. Graziadei is the owner of Los Angeles-based Firewater Studios.

Biohazard 

In 1987, Graziadei became a member of Biohazard alongside Evan Seinfeld, Anthony Meo and Bobby Hambel. Through their music, the band has promoted tolerance, opposed racism, spoken out against drug abuse all while speaking about the realities of inner city life.

Other projects

Firewater Studios 
In 2000, the band renovated their rehearsal space creating a digital recording studio in Downtown Brooklyn, New York named Rat Piss Studios. In 2005, while working on Means to an End, their eighth studio album, the band opened the larger and less expensive Underground Sound Studios in South Amboy, New Jersey, leaving Rat Piss Studios behind. In 2010, Graziadei moved his recording space to Los Angeles, California changing its name to Firewater Studios.

Blu 
Graziadei briefly formed a trip hop project named Blu with Jenifer Bair of the Ohio band Hilo. After writing and recording approximately twenty songs for the project, Bair relocated to Los Angeles, California to continue an art career and the project dissolved with all material, save for three demo tracks, remaining unreleased.

Suicide City 

In 2004, Graziadei started Suicide City with Groovenics singer Karl Bernholtz, Groovenics/Ghost Fight guitarist A. J. Marchetta, Kittie bassist Jennifer Arroyo and New York drummer Danny Lamagna.

Roadrunner United 

In December 2005, Graziadei and Evan Seinfeld performed Biohazard's "Punishment" with Dino Cazares of Fear Factory, Andreas Kisser of Sepultura, Adam Duce of Machine Head and Joey Jordison of Slipknot. This recording was released on the Roadrunner United: The Concert DVD three years later.

Blood for Blood 

In 2010, Graziadei was selected by Boston hardcore band Blood for Blood to fill in for their former guitarist Rob Lind.

Powerflo 

In 2017, Graziadei formed Powerflo, featuring lead vocalist Senen Reyes, better known as Sen Dog from Cypress Hill, lead guitarist Roy Lozano, bassist Christian Olde Wolbers, and drummer Fernando Schaefer. Graziadei is the band's rhythm guitarist and backing vocalist. The band's self-titled debut LP was released on June 23, 2017. A follow-up EP titled Bring That Shit Back followed in June 2018.

BillyBio 
In June 2018, it was announced that Graziadei was working on a studio album for his first solo project, BillyBio. The album, titled Feed the Fire, was released on November 30, 2018. BillyBio was asked to be the opening act for Life of Agony's Rise of the Underground tour in Europe October 2018. BillyBio joined Madball on tour for a few shows in early 2019. Graziadei and his solo project will head off to Europe at the end of May 2019 to play club dates and festivals, such as Antwerp Metal Fest in Belgium and Full Force Festival in Germany.

Viral 
In October 2019, the industrial crossover project Viral released their first single Disorder. The band, formed around Graziadei and singer Frankie Cassara, embarked on a European tour as a support act for the German Industrial Metal band Die Krupps.

Discography 

 Feed the Fire (2018)
 Leaders And Liars (2022)

Martial arts 
Graziadei has been training in Brazilian Jiu-Jitsu for several years, holding a black belt in the art. He trains under UFC co-founder Rorion Gracie and his sons Ryron and Rener at their school in Torrance, California.

References

External links
Biohazard official site
Firewater Studios official site
Roadrunner United official site
Suicide City official site

1969 births
American heavy metal guitarists
American heavy metal singers
American practitioners of Brazilian jiu-jitsu
Living people
Rhythm guitarists
Musicians from Brooklyn
Guitarists from New York (state)
American male guitarists
20th-century American guitarists
20th-century American male musicians
Powerflo members
American people of Italian descent
Suicide City members
Biohazard (band) members